Majara Residence (Persian: ماجرا meaning adventure) is a seaside accommodation complex in the island of Hormuz in the Persian Gulf, South of Iran. The building consists of 200 colorful domes of varying sizes and shapes built with the participation of the local population of the island, using the Superadobe sandbag technique. The domes, some of them interconnected, contain both accommodation (17 suites hosting up to 85 guests) and public facilities such as restaurants and cafes. Majara, as the first major eco-touristic hotel on the island, was completed in 2020. It is designed by the Tehran-based architectural firm ZAV Architects and since its completion, it has been recognized internationally with several awards.

History

Hormuz Island
Hormuz used to be the name of a historic port in mainland Iran before circa 1300, located on important trade routes, whose ruler moved it to the Island of Hormuz, 8 kilometers off the mainland, to found the new port of Hormuz out of the reach of robbers. Once again, it became a thriving trade center in the region. Its decline started with the Portuguese occupation of the island circa 1500. Later taken back by Iran's Shah Abbas, it never reached the success of the past. Today it is inhabited by around 6000 people whose main occupation is fishing. Most of the island is arid and uninhabited and the economy is fragile. In the media, the name of the island is strongly connected to the strait of Hormuz, a strategic oil transit chokepoint that is often a site of tension between the Iranian government and the Western powers. The island has rich natural features and geology and some of the island's coastlines are nature reserves. This small island with an area of 42 square kilometers offers a great variety of attractive mountainous and seaside landscapes.

Tourism development in recent years
According to research, ecological, geographical, and cultural resources of the Hormuz island are potentials for its development as an ecotourism and geotourism destination. Since 2009 through an annual land art event, tourists and nature-lovers started to rediscover the somewhat forgotten island. During this annual event called the Soil Carpet of Hormuz, in a coast 5 kilometers outside the boundaries of Hormuz city towards the west, a large area of 1300 square meters was covered with the ochre of various colors naturally existing in the island, tracing a pattern similar to that of a carpet but in a much larger scale, and therefore every year a carpet was “woven” using sand with the participation of artists and people. Today Hormuz is one of the most visited Iranian islands in the Persian Gulf despite lacking touristic infrastructure. 
The last Soil Carpet Event was held in 2014. Six years later in 2020, Majara residence was completed in the location of the campsite next to the soil carpet coast, with the participation of the Soil Carpet Event organizers, investors from Tehran, and the local people of Hormuz.

Presence in Hormuz Development Plan
Presence in Hormuz's goal is to take a sensitive approach to the impact of mass tourism, through a series of private initiatives intended to draw tourists to an island lacking touristic infrastructure in an environmentally sensitive way to support the community. According to the architects, the goal of presence in Hormuz is not exactly boosting the number of visitors but to manage and monitor their presence on the island, their interaction with the local community, and their awareness of the fragile ecosystem of the island. Based on their timeline, Majara Residence is the second phase of Presence in Hormuz, hence its other name Presence in Hormuz 02. Other projects include Rong cultural center which opened in 2017 and Badban, a center for human-resource training and the management hub for the whole development, completed in 2021.

Architecture
Majara residence consists of 200 domes, some of them interconnected, with different sizes and shapes, organized in a gateless area in a fashion similar to a small neighborhood or a village, 5 kilometers outside the city of Hormuz.  
The small-scale domes take on organic shapes and connect in a variety of ways to form clustered structures. In between these clusters, walkways and other connective spaces for gathering, playing, and resting are formed. It has an area of 10300 square meters, with 6300 square meters of open spaces and 4000 of built area. The domes are capable of accommodating a variety of programs, 130 domes host 17 suites with a maximum capacity to host 85 guests. The rest of the domes have public uses such as galleries, restaurants, cafes, prayer room, souvenir shop, and tourist info points.  
The domes are made using the Superadobe technique, a construction technology pioneered by Iranian-American architect Nader Khalili in the second half of the 20th century, which earned him an Aga Khan Award. The technique involves layering bags filled with earth and sand, using, on-site soil to create a compression structure like domes and other structural forms. For Majara, ZAV customized the Superadobe process to allow the creation of larger-radius and lower-height domes. In this process, 50 local unskilled workers were trained to become construction masters. This type of structure is well-suited to the arid climate of the island as earth provides a high thermal mass. 
The project's commercial goal was to complete the project with minimal investment, the budget of the project being equivalent to 900.000 US Dollars (1.800.000.000.000 IRR in 2020). Within its low budget, it shifts its impetus from material costs that often bear an excessive transportation/import component, to labor costs that directly benefit the community.  
The shape and colors of the building try to echo Hormuz's colorful landscapes and topography. The domes of Majara are colored with tints of yellow, red, blue, and green, and the use of the naturally colored ochre of the island was avoided due to environmental reasons. The interiors are also characterized by these tones whose variations match exterior colors. Pieces of furniture are a mix of pieces produced in the region and custom designs executed by Hormuz craftspeople.

See also 
Hormuz Island
Iranian architecture
Superadobe

References

 
Tourist attractions in Hormozgan Province
Buildings and structures in Iran
Buildings and structures in Hormozgan Province